Thorium(IV) carbide (ThC) is an inorganic thorium compound and a carbide.

References

Bibliography
 

Carbides
Thorium compounds
Rock salt crystal structure